Henry Clinton may refer to:

 Henry Clinton, 2nd Earl of Lincoln (1539–1616), English peer, styled Lord Clinton from 1572 to 1585
 Henry Clinton, 7th Earl of Lincoln (1684–1728), uncle of Sir Henry Clinton (1730–1795)
 Sir Henry Clinton (British Army officer, born 1730) (General, 1730–1795), general during the American War of Independence; British Commander-in-Chief in North America
 Sir Henry Clinton (British Army officer, born 1771) (Lieutenant General, 1771–1829), son of Sir Henry Clinton (1730–1795), British Army officer; general officer during Napoleonic Wars
 Henry Fynes Clinton (1781–1852), English classical scholar and chronologist

See also
 Henry Pelham-Clinton (disambiguation)